"Coming of Age" is a song by American indie pop band Foster the People from their second studio album, Supermodel. It was written by Mark Foster, Mark Pontius and Cubbie Fink of the band, along with British music producer Paul Epworth and close collaborators Sean Cimino and Isom Innis. The song was released as the lead single from Supermodel in the United States on January 14, 2014, and in the United Kingdom on March 16, 2014.

Composition
"Coming of Age" was written with Foster the People frontman Mark Foster's social life as a background to the song. Foster stated to XFM London:
"Lyrically it is almost a confession. It is about a moment of clarity, having a moment of clarity and I think for me this year, being home, was that quiet after the storm of touring for two years and my life drastically changing. It was kind of the first breath I had to really look around and see that there were some things that happened during that period with my friends and with my loved ones, with the people that are close to me and with myself as well. It is the first time that I got a clear look on those things and that's kind of what the song is about. It's about growing up."

Recording
The song was the last to be written and recorded during the recording sessions for Supermodel. The song was conceived during the recording of the album, and had not been written beforehand. Mark Foster described it as a song that "came out of nowhere", saying, "It's kind of funny, it's the last song we wrote and recorded and it is the first song everybody is going to hear".

Music video
"Coming of Age" premiered on YouTube on January 13, 2014, with the song being accompanied by time-lapse footage depicting the creation of a mural of the Supermodel cover. Directed by Vern Moen and Zachary Rockwood, the video was filmed in South Los Angeles Street and showcases the LA Freewalls project.

The official music video, directed by BRTHR, followed on February 6, 2014. The video inspired by 1980s teen films, depicts the stories of various struggling Californian children, intercut with footage of the band playing on a stage. Scenes include a dejected high school student wearing a mascot suit and being bullied by jocks, a teenager running away from cops, a young boxer struggling in the ring, and angst-ridden teenagers confronting a group of popular students. Describing the video, Foster stated: "The emotional arcs of the characters were pretty empowering." He singled out the boxer subplot as his favorite, as it reminded him of the 1976 film Rocky.

Reception
Garrett Kamps of Spin described it as "a breezy pop song with innocuous lyrics [...] that's not so ostentatious as to call attention to itself, a sweet spot these guys used to find more often".

Track listing

Personnel
Foster the People
 Cubbie  – bass
 Mark Foster – lead vocals, guitar, synthesizer, harpsichord, piano
 Mark Pontius – drums

Additional personnel
 Isom Innis – synthesizer, programming
 Sean Cimino – rhythm acoustic guitar, additional effects
 Paul Epworth – programming, modular synth

Charts

Weekly charts

Year-end charts

Release history

References

2014 singles
Foster the People songs
Columbia Records singles
Song recordings produced by Paul Epworth
Songs written by Paul Epworth
2014 songs
Songs written by Mark Foster (singer)